14th BSFC Awards
December 19, 1993

Best Film: 
 Schindler's List 
The 14th Boston Society of Film Critics Awards honored the best filmmaking of 1993. The awards were given on 19 December 1993

Winners
Best Film:
Schindler's List
Best Actor:
Daniel Day-Lewis – In the Name of the Father
Best Actress:
Holly Hunter – The Piano
Best Supporting Actor:
Ralph Fiennes – Schindler's List
Best Supporting Actress:
Rosie Perez – Fearless
Best Director:
Steven Spielberg – Schindler's List
Best Screenplay:
Robert Altman and Frank Barhydt – Short Cuts
Best Cinematography:
Janusz Kamiński – Schindler's List
Best Documentary:
Visions of Light
Best Foreign-Language Film:
Farewell My Concubine (Ba wang bie ji) • China/Hong Kong

External links
Past Winners

References 
1993 Boston Society of Film Critics Awards Internet Movie Database

1993
1993 film awards
December 1993 events in the United States
1993 awards in the United States
1993 in Boston